Paisley or paisley pattern is an ornamental textile design using the boteh or buta, a teardrop-shaped motif with a curved upper end. Of Persian origin, paisley designs became popular in the West in the 18th and 19th centuries, following imports of post-Mughal Empire versions of the design from India, especially in the form of Kashmir shawls, and were then replicated locally.

Although the pine cone or almond-like form is of Persian origin, and the textile designs cramming many of them into a rich pattern are originally Indian, the English name for the patterns derives from the town of Paisley, in the west of Scotland, a centre for textiles where paisley designs were produced.  

In the mid- to late 1960s, paisley became identified with psychedelic style and enjoyed mainstream popularity, partly due to the Beatles. Consequently, the style was particularly popular during the Summer of Love in 1967. The company Fender made a pink paisley version of their Telecaster guitar, by sticking paisley wallpaper onto the guitar bodies.

The pattern is still commonly seen in Britain and other English-speaking countries on men's ties, waistcoats, and scarfs, and remains popular in other items of clothing and textiles in Iran and South and Central Asian countries.

Origins

Some design scholars believe the buta is the convergence of a stylized floral spray and a cypress tree: a Zoroastrian symbol of life and eternity. The "bent" cedar is also a sign of strength and resistance but modesty. The floral motif was originated in the Sassanid dynasty and later in the Safavid dynasty of Persia (1501–1736), and was a major textile pattern in Iran during the Qajar and Pahlavi dynasties. In these periods, the pattern was used to decorate royal regalia, crowns, and court garments, as well as textiles used by the general population.  Persian and Central Asian designs usually range the motifs in orderly rows, with a plain background.

Ancient Indo-Iranian origins 

There is significant speculation as to the origins and symbolism of Boteh Jehgeh, or "ancient motif", known in English as paisley.  With experts contesting different time periods for its emergence, to understand the proliferation in the popularity of Boteh Jehgeh design and eventually Paisley, it is important to understand South Asian history. The early Indo-Iranian people flourished in South Asia, where they eventually exchanged linguistic, cultural, and even religious similarities.  The ancient Indo-Iranian people shared a religion called Zoroastrianism. Zoroastrianism, some experts argue, served as one of the earliest influences for Boteh Jegeh's design with the shape representing the cypress tree, an ancient zoroastrian religious symbol. Others contest that the earliest representation of the patterns shape comes from the Sassanid Dynasty, who lived in modern-day Iran, dating to more than 2,200 years BCE and remained in power until the 3rd century CE. The design was representative of a tear drop.  Some will argue that Boteh Jehgeh's origins stem from old religious beliefs and its meaning could symbolize the sun, a phoenix, or even an ancient Iranian religious sign for an eagle. Around the same time, a pattern called Boteh was gaining popularity in Iran; the pattern was a floral design, and was used as a high class decoration, mostly serving to decorate royal items that belonged to those of high status. It was said to have been a pattern worn to represent elite social status, such as that of nobility. The pattern was traditionally woven onto silk clothing using silver and gold material. The earliest evidence of the design being traded with other cultures was found at the Red Sea, with both Egyptian and Greek peoples trading from the 1400s.

Introduction of Boteh Jegeh to Western culture 
In the 18th and 19th centuries, the British East India Company introduced Kashmir shawls from India to England and Scotland where they were extremely fashionable and soon duplicated.  The first place in the western world to imitate the design was the town of Paisley in Scotland, Europe's top producer of textiles at this time.  Before being produced in Paisley, thus gaining its name in western culture, the paisley design was originally referred to by westerners simply as just pine and cone design. Technological innovation in textile manufacturing around this time made it so that western imitations of Kashmir shawls became competitive with Indian made shawls from Kashmir.

With the industrial revolution taking place in Europe, paisley shawls were manufactured at an industrial rate, and while the shawls from India could be quite expensive at the time, factory manufactured shawls made it so that the fashion became commonplace among middle-class people, thus boosting the design's popularity even more.  While the western world appropriated much of eastern culture and design, the Boteh design was by far the most popular. Records indicate that William Moorcroft, an English businessman and explorer, visited the Himalayan mountains in the mid 1800s; upon his arrival, he was enthralled by Boteh designed Kashmir shawls and tried to arrange for entire families of Indian textile workers to move their lives to the United Kingdom.  The earliest paisley shawls made in the United Kingdom, in Paisley, Scotland, were made out of fleece, a material that is put together in such a way that one side can be described as containing a soft, fluffy texture.

In Asia the paisley shawls were primarily worn by males often in formal or ceremonial contexts, but in Europe the shawls were primarily worn by women instead of men.  While still holding an accurate resemblance to its original influence, the paisley design would begin to change once it began to be produced in western culture, with different towns in the United Kingdom applying their own spin to the design.  The peak period of paisley as a fashionable design ended in the 1870s, perhaps as so many cheap versions were on the market.

The 1960s proved to be a massive time of revival for the paisley design in western culture. Popular culture in the United States developed a sort of fixation on eastern cultures in which many traditionally Indian styles became popularized.  Paisley served as one of the styles to be revived, being worn by the likes of the Beatles, even the guitar company Fender used the design to decorate one of their most famous guitars, the Fender Telecaster. Today, the design remains common appearing on jewellery, suit ties, pocket books, cake decorations, tattoos, mouse pads for computers, scarves, and dresses.  The pattern also influences furniture design internationally, with many countries using the paisley design for things such as wallpaper, pillows, curtains, and bed spreads.

Local manufacturers in Marseille began to mass-produce the patterns via early textile printing processes in 1640.  England, circa 1670, and Holland, in 1678, soon followed.  This in turn provided Europe's weavers with more competition than they could bear, and the production and import of printed paisley was forbidden in France by royal decree from 1686 to 1759.  However, enforcement near the end of that period was lax, and France had its own printed textile manufacturing industry in place as early at 1746 in some locales.  Paisley was not the only design produced by French textile printers; the demand for paisley which created the industry there also made possible production of native patterns such as toile de Jouy.

In the 1800s, European production of paisley increased, particularly in the Scottish town from which the pattern takes its modern name.  Soldiers returning from the colonies brought home cashmere wool shawls from India, and the East India Company imported more. The design was copied from the costly silk and wool Kashmir shawls and adapted first for use on handlooms, and, after 1820, on Jacquard looms.

From roughly 1800 to 1850, the weavers of the town of Paisley in Renfrewshire, Scotland, became the foremost producers of Paisley shawls.  Unique additions to their hand-looms and Jacquard looms allowed them to work in five colours when most weavers were producing paisley using only two.  The design became known as the Paisley pattern.  By 1860, Paisley could produce shawls with 15 colours, which was still only a quarter of the colors in the multicolour paisleys then still being imported from Kashmir.
In addition to the loom-woven fabric, the town of Paisley became a major site for the manufacture of printed cotton and wool in the 1800s, according to the Paisley Museum and Art Galleries.  The paisley pattern was being printed, rather than woven, onto other textiles, including cotton squares which were the precursors of the modern bandanna.  Printed paisley was cheaper than the costly woven paisley and this added to its popularity. The key places of printing paisley were Britain and the Alsace region of France.

At the 2010 Winter Olympics, Azerbaijan's team sported colorful paisley trousers.
It was the emblem of the 2012 FIFA U-17 Women's World Cup, held in Azerbaijan.

Islamic control in South Asia and spread of the pattern 
In Persian language, Boteh can be translated to shrub or bush, while in Kashmir it carried the same meaning but was referred to as Buta, or Bu. One of the earliest evidence of the pattern as it relates to Islamic culture has been found at Noh Gumba mosque, in the city of Balkh in Afghanistan, where it is predicted that the pattern was included in the design as early as the 800s when the mosque was built.  In early Iranian culture, the design was woven onto Termeh, one of the most valuable materials in early Iran where the design served to make clothing for the nobility.  At this time, the Iranian nobility wore distinct uniforms called Khalaat, historically, the design was commonly found on the Khalaat uniforms. It is stated that at some point in the 1400s, Boteh was transported from Persia to Kashmir.  In the same century, in the 1400s, some of the earliest recorded Kashmir shawls were produced in India, records from the 1500s, during Emperor Akbar's reign over the Mughal people in this area indicate that shawl making was already fashionable in India prior to Mughal conquest which took place in the early 1400s.  It has been stated that during Emperor Akbars reign over the Mughal empire, Boteh Jehgeh shawls were extremely popular and fashionable.  While one shawl was traditionally worn previously, it was during the rule of Emperor Akbar that the emperor decided to wear two shawls at a time to serve as a status symbol.  Along with wearing the shawls frequently, Emperor Akbar also used the shawls as gifts to other rulers and high officials.  It is believed that by the 1700s, Kashmir shawls were produced in the image that someone today would associate with modern paisley.

Paisley bandanas 

While today some people associate bandanas with cowboys or Cholo culture, paisley bandanas were popular during the late 1700s and their popularity in the United States coincides with the American revolution.  In the late 18th and early 19th centuries, paisley bandanas began to appear with political and military advertisements printed on them.  Such printed bandanas were prevalent during the early and mid- 1900s when World War I and World War II were being fought.  It was thought that by purchasing and sporting a pro-war paisley bandana the buyer was helping to support their country in winning the war.  The paisley bandana started to feature in Western movies and thus became a symbol of the American West.

Through the 1970s, paisley bandanas were worn by many blue collar and labor workers to keep dust out of their mouths and noses. The bandana's symbolism once again shifted in American minds, being associated with hard work.  Famous country singer Willie Nelson began wearing bandanas when he moved from Nashville back to Austin, Texas "just in time to catch the hippie wave cresting at counterculture center the Armadillo World Headquarters." Around the same time, bandanas also became popular with motorcyclists, particularly with Harley Davidson riders and bikers."  In the 1970s paisley bandanas also became popular amongst gangs in California, most notably with two well-known rival gangs, the Bloods who would wear red bandanas and the Crips who would wear blue bandanas.

Prince paid tribute to the rock and roll history of paisley when he created the Paisley Park Records recording label and established Paisley Park Studios, both named after his 1985 song "Paisley Park". The Paisley Underground was a music scene active around the same time.

Paisley was a favorite design element of British-Indian architect Laurie Baker. He has made numerous drawings and collages of what he called "mango designs". He used to include the shape in the buildings he designed also.

In other languages

In various languages of India and Pakistan, the design's name is related to the word for mango:
 In Bengali: kalka
 In Telugu: mamidi pinde', young mango pattern
 In Tamil: mankolam, mango pattern
 In Marathi: koyari, mango seed
 In Hindi/Urdu: carrey or kerii, means unripe mango
 In Punjabi: ambi, from amb, mango.

In Chinese, it is known as the "ham hock pattern" in Mainland China, or "Amoeba pattern" in Taiwan. In Russia, this ornament is known as "cucumbers".Boteh is a Persian word meaning bush, cluster of leaves or a flower bud.

References

 Citations 

Sources
Dusenbury, Mary M. and Bier, Carol, Flowers, Dragons & Pine Trees: Asian Textiles in the Spencer Museum of Art, 2004, Hudson Hills, 9781555952389, p. 48
 F. Petri, Origin of the Book of the Dead Angient Egipt''. 1926. June part 2 с 41–45
 С. Ашурбейли «Новые изыскания по истории Баку и Девичьей башни» Альманах искусств 1972 г, С.Ашурбейли «О датировке и назначении Гыз галасы в крепости» Элм. 1974 г.

Further reading 

 .
 .
 .

17th-century fashion
18th-century fashion
19th-century fashion
20th-century fashion
21st-century fashion
Renfrewshire
Persian culture
Tamil culture
Scottish design
Scottish clothing
Textile patterns
Visual motifs
Paisley, Renfrewshire